Linda Faye Vaughn (born August 14, 1942 in Dalton, Georgia, United States) is an American motor racing personality who has been described as the "preeminent beauty queen of stock car racing", and "The First Lady of Motorsports".

Vaughn was named "Miss Queen of Speed at Atlanta International Raceway" aged 18 and has acquired many other titles since then, including Miss Hurst Golden Shifter. Vaughn has been a notable ambassador and promoter of various forms of American motor racing for several decades.

She was chosen to be the queen of the 1961 Dixie 400. Her height is 5 ft 1/2 in (1.54 m), but her measurements were 39-23-39 inches (99-58-99 cm) when she was chosen to be Miss Firebird in 1960's first half. In 1970's, her measurements were 39-26-37 in (99-66-94 cm). She married Billy Tidwell (drag racer) in 1972. They divorced in 1986.

She appeared in the 1976 film The Gumball Rally, and the 1983 film Stroker Ace.

She was inducted into the Motorsports Hall of Fame of America in 2019.

References

External links 
 

Living people
1943 births
NASCAR people
People from Dalton, Georgia
Racing drivers' wives and girlfriends